The Pskov electoral district was a constituency created for the 1917 Russian Constituent Assembly election. The electoral district covered the Pskov Governorate.

Electorate
At the time of the election Pskov Governorate had an estimated population of 1,264,900. The great majority lived in rural areas, the Governorate had some 120,000 town-dwellers. The number of eligible voters were some 854,000.

District Election Commission
Per the electoral regulation the District Election Commission should have been chaired by the head of the newly elected provincial zemstvo, but no such election had been held. Instead, the Pskov District Election Commission was chaired by S. M. Schilling, member of the Pskov District Court. The Commission held its first meeting on September 9, 1917, and elected local Kadet leader A. P. Melnikov as Deputy Commission Chairman. 8 uezd-level local election commissions were formed.

The district was divided into precincts: Pskov city 6 precincts, Pskov uezd 138, Ostrov town 1, Ostrov uezd 12, Porkhov town 1, Soltsy town 1, Porkhov uezd 22, Velikiye Luki town 6, Velikiye Luki uezd 137, Toropets town 2, Toropets uezd 18, Novorzhev town 1, Novorzhev uezd 90, Kholm town 1, Kholm uezd 177, Opochka town 1, Prigorod Krasny 1 and Opochka uezd 15.

Candidates
The 2nd Pskov Provincial Congress of Soviets of Soldiers and Workers' Deputies was held on September 26–28, 1917 and the 2nd Pskov Provincial Congress of Soviets of Peasants Deputies was held October 6–10, 1917. Socialist-Revolutionary Party leaders Victor Chernov and Catherine Breshkovsky addressed the peasants' congress. At these and other meetings preparations for the elections and drafting of candidate lists were done.

Out of 13 lists that were submitted to the electoral authorities, 4 were barred from contesting. The accepted lists were,

Voting
The Socialist-Revolutionaries won the election in Pskov electoral district. Only in Toropetsky uezd did the Bolshevik list win, where it obtained 58.7% of the vote. There was a 60.3% voter turnout in the district.

Five SR deputies and three Bolshevik deputies were elected. Out of the SR deputies, all but Pokrovsky were Left Socialist-Revolutionaries. The head of the Bolshevik list, Kamenev, had been elected from four different electoral districts, and opted not to represent Pskov. Likewise, Mikhail Lashevich, the second candidate on the Bolshevik list was also elected from the Western Front electoral district, and opted to represent his military constituency. So the Pskov seats were given to candidates 3, 4 and 5 on the Bolshevik list.

A priest was killed in connection with the election day, one of few violent incidents across the country.

References

Electoral districts of the Russian Constituent Assembly election, 1917
Pskov Governorate